was a Japanese woodblock print artist, painter, sculptor and stage designer. He was born in Kojima in Okayama Prefecture. His father was a ceramic artist and head of the Kyoto Industrial Craft Company. Kobashi learned printmaking from the sōsaku hanga (creative prints) master Unichi Hiratsuka (1895–1997). In 1955, Kobashi graduated from the Kyoto College of Crafts and Textiles, and in 1959, he moved to New York City. Nelson Rockefeller (governor of New York and later vice-president) was Kobashi's patron, and acquired one of the artist's sculptures for the New York State Executive Mansion in Albany.

Kobashi is best known for his sōsaku hanga woodblock prints and his sculptures intended to be rearranged, which he called "self-constructions". The Cleveland Museum of Art, the Honolulu Museum of Art, the Metropolitan Museum of Art, the Museum of Modern Art (New York City), the Neuberger Museum of Art (Purchase, New York), the Weisman Art Museum (University of Minnesota, Minneapolis), and Southern Illinois University Edwardsville are among the public collections holding work by Kobashi.

Footnotes

References
 Baron, Virginia Olsen, The Seasons of Time; Tanka Poetry of Ancient Japan, Illustrated by Yasuhide Kobashi, New York, Dial Press, 1968. 
 Eichman, Shawn and Sawako Takemura Chang, Self-construction: The Art of Kobashi Yasuhide, Honolulu Academy of Arts, Vol. 82, No. 6, Nov./Dec., 2010, pp. 6–7.
 Garfias, Robert and Lincoln Kirstein, Gagaku: The Music and Dances of the Japanese Imperial Household with calligraphy by Yasuhide Kobashi, New York, Theatre Arts Books, 1959.
 Kirstein, Lincoln, Kobashi. Recent Sculpture by Yasuhide Kobashi, New York, Allan Stone, 1961.
 Pratt Graphic Art Center, Eleven Prints by Eleven Printmakers, New York, Pratt Graphic Art Center, 1961.

Modern printmakers
Sosaku hanga artists
Modern sculptors
Japanese sculptors
Modern painters
20th-century American painters
American male painters
21st-century American painters
Japanese painters
American production designers
1931 births
2003 deaths
20th-century American sculptors
American male sculptors
20th-century American printmakers
20th-century American male artists